James "Husalah" Ratliff (born May 13, 1979), is an American rapper from Pittsburg, California. He began his career with the Pittsburg group the Mob Figaz, whose first album, C-Bo's Mob Figaz, was released in 1999. Like his late close friend The Jacka, Husalah is a Muslim, and frequently references Islam in his lyrics. He has released three solo studio albums (Dope, Guns and Religion, Hustlin’ Since the ‘80s, and The H), as well as numerous group projects.

Career
Husalah began his career with the Pittsburg-based group Mob Figaz. Their first album, C-Bo's Mob Figaz, was released in 1999 and was a minor hit on the Billboard Hip Hop charts, entering in at #63. The album sold fairly well, selling 60,000 units. His first solo album, entitled Dope, Guns, and Religion, was released in 2006 and was one of the most highly anticipated Bay Area hip-hop albums of the time.

Husalah has collaborated with many respected and noteworthy rappers, including E-40, Too Short, Kool G Rap, Cormega, Paul Wall, Freeway, the late Mac Dre, Andre Nickatina, Keak Da Sneak, Lil B The Based God, Yukmouth, Clyde Carson, and Roach Gigz, among others.

Discography

Solo albums

Studio albums
 2007: Huslin Since Da 80's
 2018: H

Mixtapes
 2006: Dope, Guns & Religion
 2010: Tha Furly Ghost Vol. 3

Collaborative albums

With Mob Figaz
 1999: C-Bo's Mob Figaz

With Mob Figaz alumni
 2002: Camp Mob Figaz: The Street Soundtrack (with various)
 2003: Mob Figaz
 2005: 3 Da Hard Way (with The Jacka & Marvaless)
 2006: Animal Planet (with The Jacka)
 2006: Mob Trial (with AP.9 & The Jacka)
 2007: Without My 5 (with AP.9)

Additional collaborations
 2007: Explosive Mode 3: The Mob Gets Explosive  (with The Jacka, Messy Marv & San Quinn)
 2008: The Tonka Boyz (with B-Luv) (R&B #57 / Heatseekers #49)
 2014 Tortoise and the Hare (with Blanco & Kokane)

Guest Appearances
2001. "Target Practice" (with The Jacka, Earl Haze, Kozi & Yukmouth) on (The Jacka Of The Mob Figaz) 
2010. "Lightweight Jammin'" (with E-40, & Clyde Carson on (Revenue Retrievin': Day Shift)
2016. "This Goin' Up" (with E-40, & Turf Talk) on (The D-Boy Diary: Book 2)

References

External links
Husalah at Discogs
[ Husalah] at allmusic

1979 births
Living people
African-American rappers
African-American Muslims
Mob Figaz members
People from Pittsburg, California
Rappers from the San Francisco Bay Area
Gangsta rappers
21st-century American rappers
21st-century African-American musicians
20th-century African-American people